Roccafluvione is a comune (municipality) in the Province of Ascoli Piceno in the Italian region Marche, located about  south of Ancona and about  west of Ascoli Piceno.

Roccafluvione borders the following municipalities: Acquasanta Terme, Ascoli Piceno, Comunanza, Montegallo, Palmiano, Venarotta.

References

External links

Cities and towns in the Marche